Tol is one of nine parishes (administrative divisions) in the Castropol municipality, within the province and autonomous community of Asturias, in northern Spain.  The population is 340 (INE 2005).

References

Parishes in Castropol